Íñigo López de Mendoza (died after 1203) was a Basque nobleman, 4th Lord of  Llodio.

Life 
The first to use the toponymic surname Mendoza, Íñigo, was the son of Lope Íñiguez — son of another Íñigo López — and his wife Teresa Jiménez, daughter of Jimeno Íñiguez, Lord of Cameros. His brother Gonzalo López de Mendoza was the first Lord of Mendoza.  Íñigo confirmed several donations and transactions by members of the House of Haro. He probably participated in several military campaigns of King Alfonso VIII of Castile in 11991200, and also confirmed several royal charters in 12021203.

Marriage and issue 

Íñigo married María García by whom he had the following children: 
 Íñigo Íñiguez de Mendoza
 Diego Íñiguez de Mendoza
 Urraca Íñiguez de Mendoza
 Milia Iñiguez de Mendoza  wife of Fernán Gutiérrez de Castro.
 Inés Íñiguez de Mendoza, mistress of King Alfonso IX of León, the parents of Urraca Alfonso, wife of Lope Díaz II de Haro, Lord of Biscay.

Notes

References

Bibliography 
 

 

12th-century nobility from León and Castile
13th-century Castilians
Spanish Roman Catholics